Portrait of the Gozzadini Family (La Famiglia Gozzadini) is a 1584 oil on canvas painting by Bolognese artist Lavinia Fontana. It currently hangs in the Pinacoteca Nazionale in Bologna.

Painting 
This Mannerist painting depicts Laudomia Gozzadini, the painting's commissioner, and her sister Ginevra in the foreground, their father Senator Ulisse Gozzadini seated with them, and their husbands Camillo and Annibale standing behind. Ulisse and Ginevra, who are linked by his hand on her arm, were deceased at the time of the painting. Between her and her late family, Laudomia's hand rests on a dog, a symbol of fidelity, perhaps symbolizing her loyalty to their memory. The two women are dressed in full wedding regalia, Laudomia in a bold red that sets her apart from the other more neutrally attired subjects. Camillo's sword and cross signify his identity as a knight of the Portuguese Order of Christ, while the paper in Annibale's hand may allude to his control over the sisters' finances.

Commission 
It is suggested that Laudomia Gozzadini commissioned this portrait as a statement of her legitimacy and patrimonial rights. Correspondence shows that Annibale, the executor of Ulisse's will, owed Laudomia money; over this conflict she took him to court. Painting the sisters in their decadent wedding jewelry, purchased by their father, is interpreted as a reminder that the money they brought with them into their marriages is ultimately of their own inheritance, and not to be withheld from them by their husbands. Compositional support for this theory includes the rendering of the sisters in front of their husbands, taking up much more space, light falling directly onto their faces, while their husbands fade into the dark background.

Notes

References 

 Murphy, Caroline P. (2003). "Laudomia Gozzadini and her Family Portrait." Lavinia Fontana: A Painter and Her Patrons in Sixteenth-century Bologna. Yale University Press. .
 Murphy, Caroline P. (1996). "Lavinia Fontana and 'Le Dame Della Citta': Understanding Female Artistic Patronage in Late Sixteenth-Century Bologna." Renaissance Studies. 10 (2): 190-208. JSTOR 24412268.

1584 paintings
16th-century portraits
Paintings in the collection of the Pinacoteca Nazionale di Bologna
Dogs in art
Group portraits by Italian artists